The Ladies Tour of Norway is a women's cycle stage race. The first edition of the race was held from 15 to 17 August 2014 based in the town of Halden in south east Norway. It consisted of an individual time trial prologue and two road race stages. Since 2017 the race is part of the UCI Women's World Tour, cycling's season-long competition of top-tier events.

Overall winners

External links

Results on cqranking.com
Start list and results on cyclingfever.com

2014 establishments in Norway
Women's road bicycle races
Cycle races in Norway
Summer events in Norway
UCI Women's World Tour races